Rahman Rezaei (born 20 February 1975) is an Iranian football coach and former player. A centre-back, he also represented the Iran national team.

Club career 
He was originally discovered by Iranian manager, Nasser Hejazi. Rezaei played for Zob Ahan in Isfahan for five seasons. After impressive performances for the club and the national team, he was transferred to Perugia for €150,000 and then to Messina.

Rahman Rezaei is currently the most successful Asian defender in Europe. In the 2003/2004 season, he helped Messina gain promotion to Serie A. He had been one of Messina's most consistently used players with 36 appearances in their 2004–05 mid-table finish. After steadily playing for his club for three seasons, at the end of August 2006 Rezaei signed with another Serie A club, Livorno.

He has won numerous plaudits in Italy and has been dubbed "The Flying Carpet". In addition, his fans in Messina have named him the "Secretary of Defense". In January 2006, he acquired Italian citizenship through his marriage to an Italian-Iranian Helia Hashemi.

In July 2008, an Iranian newspaper reported Iranian giants Persepolis were holding talks with Rezaei. However, in mid-July, Afshin Ghotbi was re-appointed manager of Persepolis and cut the talks with Rezaei, stating that the club were not looking for a centre-back player at that moment in time.

On 10 August 2009, Rezaei signed a one-year, $700 thousand contract with Qatari side Al Ahli SC. In 2010, he signed with Shahin Bushehr. A half-year later he joined Paykan. He announced his retirement from football on 4 July 2012.

Club career statistics

International career 
Rahman Rezaei made his first appearance for Iran in July 2001 against Bosnia. He has been the most consistent defender for the team ever since.

In European football, Rahman Rezaei is considered a solid defender well inclined to launch devastating counterattacks. However his role is different in the Iranian national football team, where he is a straight defensive centre back. He was formerly a forward, but has proved to be an indispensable defensive stalwart for an Iranian side considered top-heavy in attacking players.

He was among the key players for Iran in World Cup 2006, but he did not perform as well as everyone had hoped. He received some criticism following a couple mistakes which led to goals being scored against the team.

On 6 April 2007 Rezaei stated he will retire from international football after the 2007 Asian Cup., but in another interview in December 2007 he expressed his intention to return to the national team. Rezaei was given his #5 jersey and was selected for Team Melli's 2010 World Cup Qualification matches.

International goals 
Scores and results list Iran's goal tally first.

Director of football 
after time of playing he was director sport and coach in some clubs.

Honours

Individual 
 Asian Cup All-Star Team: 2007

Personal life 
Rezaei is married to translator Helia Hashemian, a woman of Iranian origin who was born in Assisi, Perugia.

References

External links 
  Rahman's profile on Official Website of A.S. Livorno Calcio
 Rahman Rezaei at PersianLeague.com
 Rahman Rezaei at TeamMelli.com

1975 births
Living people
People from Nur, Iran
Iranian footballers
Iran international footballers
Iranian expatriate footballers
Iranian expatriate sportspeople in Italy
Association football central defenders
Nassaji Mazandaran players
Rah Ahan players
Zob Ahan Esfahan F.C. players
A.C. Perugia Calcio players
A.C.R. Messina players
U.S. Livorno 1915 players
Persepolis F.C. players
Al Ahli SC (Doha) players
Shahin Bushehr F.C. players
Paykan F.C. players
Azadegan League players
Serie A players
Serie B players
Persian Gulf Pro League players
Qatar Stars League players
2004 AFC Asian Cup players
2006 FIFA World Cup players
2007 AFC Asian Cup players
Expatriate footballers in Italy
Expatriate footballers in Qatar
Sportspeople from Mazandaran province
Persian Gulf Pro League managers